The Iron Horse is a 1924 American silent Western film directed by John Ford and produced by Fox Film. It was a major milestone in Ford's career, and his lifelong connection to the western film genre. It was Ford's first major film, in part because the hastily planned production went over budget, as Fox was making a hurried response to the success of another studio's western. In 2011, this film was deemed "culturally, historically, or aesthetically significant" by the United States Library of Congress and selected for preservation in the National Film Registry.

Plot
The film is about the construction of the American first transcontinental railroad. It depicts Irish, Italian, and Chinese immigrants, as well as African Americans, as the men who did the backbreaking work that made this feat possible.  The primary villain is an unscrupulous businessman who masquerades as a renegade Cheyenne. It culminates with the scene of driving of the golden spike at Promontory Summit on May 10, 1869.

Cast

Production
Among the extras used in the Central Pacific sequences were several Chinese men playing coolies who worked on the railroad. They were in fact retired Central Pacific Railroad employees who had helped build the first transcontinental railroad through the Sierras, who came out to participate in the filming as a lark.

There is a note in the title before this scene that the two original locomotives from the 1869 event are used in the film, although this is false - both engines (Union Pacific No. 119 and Jupiter) were scrapped before 1910.

Legacy
In December 2011, The Iron Horse was selected for inclusion in the Library of Congress' National Film Registry. In choosing the film, the Registry said that The Iron Horse "introduced to American and world audiences a reverential, elegiac mythology that has influenced many subsequent Westerns."

The film's importance was recognized by the American Film Institute in the 2008 AFI's 10 Top 10, where it was nominated in the Western category.

Critical reception
The film has a 78% rating in Rotten Tomatoes.

Home media
The film was released on DVD in America in its full-length US version (accompanied by the truncated UK version). A 2011 release of The Iron Horse on DVD in the UK included both the US and International/UK versions of the picture, and a half-hour video-essay about the film by author and critic Tag Gallagher. The international version includes some variant shots and uses different names for some supporting characters; it also carries a dedication to the British railway engineer George Stephenson.

Near the end of the film, it is stated that the actual "Jupiter" and "UP 116" were used in the scene. Besides incorrectly identifying the "UP 119" as the "UP 116", both engines had been scrapped 21 and 15 years earlier. Of interest, however, what appears to be the Central Pacific's "C.P. Huntington", now on display in Sacramento, California, is being manhandled up a steep grade on a sledge made of logs.

Novelization
Starting in the early 1920s the publishing house Grosset and Dunlap crafted a deal with the prominent Hollywood studios to issue novelizations of their major, original releases and among those was The Iron Horse (1924, 329pp). The author was Edwin C. Hill, then a journalist, who would become a prominent radio broadcaster, best remembered for a show called The Human Side of the News.

See also
 List of American films of 1924

References

External links

 The Iron Horse essay by David Kiehn on the National Film Registry website 
 
 
 Stills at acinemahistory.com
 The Iron Horse on Amazon Prime Video

1924 films
1924 Western (genre) films
American black-and-white films
Films directed by John Ford
Fox Film films
United States National Film Registry films
Silent American Western (genre) films
1920s American films
Films with screenplays by John Russell (screenwriter)
Rail transport films
First transcontinental railroad
Films set in 1869
Films set in Utah
1920s English-language films